Bakri or Bakry may refer to:

People
 al-Bakri (1014–1094), Andalusian-Arab geographer and historian, full name Abu Abdullah al-Bakri
 Abū al-Ḥasan Bakrī, purported medieval author of Islamic fiction
 Asma El Bakry (1947–2015), Egyptian film director
 Bakri Al-Madina (born 1988), Sudanese footballer
 Dominique Bakry (born 1954), French mathematician
 Marcia Bakry (born 1937), American artist and scientific illustrator
 Mohammad Bakri (born 1953), Palestinian actor and director with Israeli citizenship
 Omar Bakri Muhammad (born 1958), Syrian Islamist, known as Omar Bakri

Places
 Bukit Bakri, a town in Muar, Johor, Malaysia
 Bakri (federal constituency), a federal parliamentary constituency in Muar, Johor, Malaysia
 Al-Bakri (crater), a lunar crater

Other
 Bakri balloon tamponade